Argyle Lake  may refer to:

Argyle Lake State Park, in Illinois
Argyle Lake, in Babylon Village, New York
Lake Argyle, in Australia

See also